Pilot Knob is a hamlet in Washington and Warren counties, New York, United States. The community is located on the eastern shore of Lake George; while the Washington-Warren county line largely follows the shoreline, placing most of the community in Washington County, a small portion lies on the Warren County side.

References

Hamlets in Washington County, New York
Hamlets in Warren County, New York
Hamlets in New York (state)